Pelorus Islet (also known as Pelorus Reef and Pelorus Rock) is an islet  in the Australian state of  South Australia located in Great Australian Bight off the south coast of Kangaroo Island approximately  east south-east of Cape Gantheaume.  It was named by Captain Francis Harding, RN after HMS Pelorus.

Description
It consists of three separate islets - a main round topped peak of  height with a reef with several rocks sitting above water level to its east and another exposed rock to its south-west. It is inaccessible by boat as it is subject to continuous swells.

Formation, geology and oceanography
Peloris Islet was formed between 7500 and 8900 years ago after sea levels rose at the start of the Holocene when Kangaroo Island became separated from Yorke and Fleurieu Peninsulas. Pelorus Islet is the remains of a volcanic intrusion reported as being some 506 million years old.

Flora and fauna
As of 1996, no terrestrial vegetation was present as the islet has been ‘scoured of any soil and small eroded fragments, leaving only a few large boulders’ while the only vertebrate animals observed were New Zealand fur seals and crested terns.

History
Nicolas Baudin is reported as being the first European to describe the islet, however he did not name the islet.  The islet was surveyed in May 1838 by HMS Pelorus under the command of Captain Francis Harding RN.  It is reported that Harding named the islet after the ship.  The Pelorus Islet is reported as being the site of the wrecking of You Yangs on 14 June 1890.  You Yangs was a 672 gross tonnage barque rigged screw steamer owned by Howard Smith and Sons.

Protected areas status
Pelorus Islet originally obtained protected area status as a fauna reserve under the former Fauna Conservation Act 1964  As of 1996, it was described as being vacant crown land.  It obtained status as a fauna conservation reserve declared under the Crown Lands Act 1929-1966 on 16 March 1967.  As of 2016, the islet is part of the Cape Gantheaume Conservation Park.   As of 2012, the waters surrounding its shores are part of a habitat protection zone located within the boundaries of the Southern Kangaroo Island Marine Park.

References

Islands of South Australia